First Avenue is a north-south thoroughfare on the East Side of the New York City borough of Manhattan, running from Houston Street northbound to 127th Street. At 125th Street, most traffic continues onto the Willis Avenue Bridge over the Harlem River, which continues into the Bronx. South of Houston Street, the roadway continues as Allen Street south to Division Street. Traffic on First Avenue runs northbound (uptown) only.

History
Like most of Manhattan's major north-south Avenues, First Avenue was proposed as part of the Commissioners' Plan of 1811 for Manhattan, which designated 12 broad north-south Avenues running the length of the island. The southern portions of the Avenue were cut and laid out shortly after the plan was adopted. The northern sections of the Avenue would be graded and cut through at various intervals throughout the 19th century as the northward development of the island demanded.

The IRT Second Avenue Line ran above First Avenue from Houston Street to 23rd Street before turning west at 23rd and then north onto Second Avenue. This elevated line was torn down in 1942.

First Avenue has carried one-way traffic since June 4, 1951.

A protected bike lane was established along the left side of the avenue south of 50th Street in 2011.

Description
First Avenue passes through a variety of neighborhoods.

Starting in the south at Houston Street, First Avenue passes through the East Village, once a predominantly German and Jewish neighborhood, now a gentrified area populated mostly by hipsters and yuppies. First Avenue then runs by two large urban development projects, Stuyvesant Town and Peter Cooper Village, two middle-income housing developments that sit on what used to be the Gashouse District, an industrial area. These fill the east side of the avenue from 14th to 23rd Streets. The avenue is very wide in this segment, and is separated by a median. The New York Veterans Affairs Medical Center, the Bellevue Hospital, and NYU Medical Center fill the blocks from there to 34th Street. Between 42nd and 47th streets, the avenue runs past United Nations Headquarters. Here a local bypass, United Nations Plaza, splits from the main road, which runs through the First Avenue Tunnel, rejoining the local street at 49th Street.

Crossing under the Queensboro Bridge and entering the Upper East Side, First Avenue runs through a number of residential areas. It serves as one of the main shopping streets of the Yorkville neighborhood, historically a working class German and Hungarian neighborhood, today a wealthy enclave of upper-class residents.  In this district, First Avenue is also known as "Bedpan Alley" (a play on "Tin Pan Alley") because of the large number of hospitals located nearby.

Crossing 96th Street, First Avenue runs through Spanish Harlem, a historically Puerto Rican neighborhood. Before Puerto Rican migration in the 1950s, much of this district was populated by Italians and known as "Italian Harlem". First Avenue in Italian Harlem was the site of a major open-air pushcart market in the late 19th and early 20th centuries. There is still a small Italian enclave in the Pleasant Valley district of East Harlem, between 114th and 120th Streets. The northern reaches of First Avenue, north of roughly 110th Street have also seen a significant increase in Mexican residents.

First Avenue then connects to the Willis Avenue Bridge, which crosses the Harlem River at 125th Street and connects to Willis Avenue in the Bronx.

Transportation
The M15/M15+ Select Bus runs on the one-way pair of First and Second Avenue between 125th Street and Houston Street. The northbound M9 runs on it between 20th Street and 29th Street, terminating at Bellevue Hospital at 26th Street. The M31, M50, M57, M86+ Select Bus and M116 serve First Avenue for short segments.

The BMT Canarsie Line has a station at 14th Street.

In popular culture
The opening scene of Ghostbusters II was filmed at the intersection of First Avenue and 77th Street.
In the Seinfeld TV series, Kramer describes the intersection of First Avenue and 1st Street as the "nexus of the universe". This provided the name for a nightclub called the Nexus Lounge at that location.

Gallery

References

External links

 
 New York Songlines: First Avenue, a virtual walking tour

01
East Harlem
East Village, Manhattan
Kips Bay, Manhattan
Midtown Manhattan
Murray Hill, Manhattan
Upper East Side